Tarragona (Phoenician: Tarqon) is a port city located in northeast Spain on the Costa Daurada by the Mediterranean Sea. Founded before the fifth century BC, it is the capital of the Province of Tarragona, and part of Tarragonès and Catalonia. Geographically, it is bordered on the north by the Province of Barcelona and the Province of Lleida. The city has a population of 136,150 (2021).

History

Origins
One Catalan legend holds that Tarragona was named for Tarraho, eldest son of Tubal in c. 2407 BC; another (derived from Strabo and Megasthenes) attributes the name to 'Tearcon the Ethiopian', a seventh-century BC pharaoh who campaigned in Spain. The real founding date of Tarragona is unknown.

William Smith suggests that the city was probably founded by the Phoenicians, who called it , which, according to Samuel Bochart, means a citadel. It was seated on the river Sulcis or Tulcis (modern Francolí), on a bay of the Mare Internum (Mediterranean), between the Pyrenees and the river Iberus (modern Ebro). This better reflects its present condition; for though a mole was constructed in the 15th century with the materials of the ancient amphitheatre, and another subsequently by an Irishman named John Smith Sinnot, it still affords little protection for shipping.

Rome

Tarraco lies on the main road along the northeastern coast of the Iberian Peninsula. During the Roman Republic, the city was fortified and much enlarged as a Roman colony by the brothers Publius Cornelius Scipio and Gnaeus Cornelius Scipio Calvus, who converted it into a fortress and arsenal against the Carthaginians. The city was first named Colonia Iulia Urbs Triumphalis Tarraco and was capital of the province of Hispania Citerior. Subsequently, it became the capital (conventus iuridicus) of the province named after it, Hispania Tarraconensis.

Augustus wintered at Tarraco after his Cantabrian campaign, and bestowed many marks of honour on the city, among which were its honorary titles of Colonia Victrix Togata and Colonia Julia Victrix Tarraconensis.

According to Mela it was the richest town on the coast, and Strabo represents its population as equal to that of Carthago Nova (now Cartagena). Its fertile plain and sunny shores are celebrated by Martial and other poets; and its neighbourhood is described as producing good wine and flax. The city also minted coins.

An inscribed stone base for a now lost statue of Tiberius Claudius Candidus was found in Tarragona during the nineteenth century. The 24-line Latin inscription describes the governor and senator's career as an ally of the future Roman emperor Septimius Severus, who fought in the civil war following the assassination of Commodus in 192 AD. This important marble block was purchased by the British Museum in 1994.

From the demise of the Roman empire to the Union of Spain

After the demise of the Western Roman Empire, the city was captured first by the Vandals and then by the Visigoths. The Visigothic Kingdom's rule of Tarracona was ended by the Umayyad conquest of Hispania in 714. It was an important border city of the Caliphate of Córdoba between 750 and 1013. After the demise of the Caliphate, it was part of the Taifa of Zaragoza between 1013 and 1110 and under the control of the Almoravid dynasty between 1110 and 1117. It was taken by the County of Barcelona in 1117. From 1129 to 1173 Tarragona was the capital of the short lived Principality of Tarragona, under the Norman-influence. After the dynastic union of Aragon and Barcelona, it was part of the Principality of Catalonia within the Crown of Aragon from 1164 to 1714. After dynastic union of Aragon and the Crown of Castile, it remained a part of the Crown of Aragon until the foundation of the Spanish Empire in 1516.

During the Reapers' War, Tarragona was captured by Catalan insurgents with French support in 1641, but it was retaken by Spanish troops in 1644. It was captured by allied Portuguese, Dutch, and British troops in 1705 during the War of the Spanish Succession and remained in their hands until the Treaty of Utrecht in 1713. During the war, the Catalans supported the unsuccessful claim of Archduke Charles, Duke of Teschen against the victorious Bourbon Duke of Anjou, who became Philip V of Spain. He signed the Nueva Planta decrees, which abolished the Crown of Aragon, as well as the Catalan institutions and prohibited the administrative use of Catalan language on 16 January 1716.

Peninsular War
During the Peninsular War, in the first siege of Tarragona from 5 May to 29 June 1811, Louis-Gabriel Suchet's Army of Aragon of the First French Empire laid siege to a Spanish garrison led by Lieutenant General Juan Senen de Contreras. A British naval squadron commanded by Admiral Edward Codrington harassed the French besiegers with cannon fire and transported large numbers of reinforcements into the city by sea. Nevertheless, Suchet's troops stormed into the defences and killed or captured almost all the defenders. It became a subprefecture centre in Bouches-de-l'Èbre department of French empire.

In the second siege of Tarragona (3–11 June 1813), an overwhelming Anglo-Spanish force under the command of Lieutenant General John Murray, 8th Baronet failed to wrest Tarragona from a small Franco-Italian garrison led by Brigadier General Antoine Marc Augustin Bertoletti. Murray was subsequently removed from command for his indecisive and contradictory leadership. The Anglo-Spanish forces finally captured Tarragona on 19 August.

Spanish Civil War

During the Spanish Civil War, Tarragona was in the hands of the Second Spanish Republic until captured by Franco's Nationalist troops on 15 January 1939 during the Catalonia Offensive.

Main sights

Ancient remains

The Roman ruins of Tarraco have been designated a World Heritage Site by UNESCO.

Part of the bases of large Cyclopean walls near the Cuartel de Pilatos are thought to pre-date the Romans. The building just mentioned, a prison in the 19th century, is said to have been the palace of Augustus. The second century Tarragona Amphitheatre near the seashore was extensively used as a quarry after the fall of the Western Roman Empire, and but few vestiges of it now remain. A circus c.  long, was built over in the area now called Plaça de la Font, though portions of it are still to be traced. Throughout the town Latin, and even apparently Phoenician, inscriptions on the stones of the houses mark the material used for buildings in the town.

Two ancient monuments, at some little distance from the town, have, however, fared rather better. There is a monument about  along the coast road east of the city, commonly called the "Tower of the Scipios"; but there is no authority for assuming that they were buried here.

Other Roman buildings include:
The Roman walls
The capitol, or citadel
The Amphitheatre
The Roman circus
The Pretorium – Tower
The Provincial and Colonial fora
The Necropolis 
The palace of Augustus, called the house of Pilate
The so-called tower, or sepulchre, of the Scipios
Arch of Sura, or of Bara
The Aurelian Way.

The city is also home to the National Archaeological Museum of Tarragona.

Religious buildings

The Tarragona Cathedral, dating to the 12th–13th centuries, combining Romanesque and Gothic architectural elements.
The convent of the Poor Clares, near the walls
The convent of Santa Teresa
The church of the Order of Friars Minor Capuchin, the parish church of the port
The former convent of Sant Francesc
The Jesuit college was turned into barracks; their church, however, has been restored to them
The convent of the Dominican Order, now the town hall
The archiepiscopal palace, situated on the site of the ancient capitol, one tower of which still remains. It was rebuilt in the 19th century.
Near the sea, in the Roman amphitheatre, are the remains of a church called Santa Maria del Miracle (Holy Mary of the Miracle), which belonged to the Knights Templar. It was afterwards used by the Trinitarian Order and was later converted into a penitentiary. It was demolished around 1915.

The seminary of Sant Pau and Santa Tecla was founded in 1570 by the cardinal archbishop, Gaspar Cervantes de Gaeta, and was the first to comply with the decrees of the Council of Trent. In 1858 Archbishop José Domingo Costa y Borrás built a fourth wing. Benito Villamitjana built a new seminary behind the cathedral in 1886, in the courtyard of which stands the old chapel of Sant Pau. Pope Leo XIII raised this to the rank of a pontifical university.

 north of the city is Poblet Monastery, founded in 1151 by Ramon Berenguer IV, Count of Barcelona, which was used for sepultures of the kings.

Modern Tarragona

Tarragona is home to a large port and the Rovira i Virgili University. Much of its economic activity comes from a large number of chemical industries located south of the city.

The main living heritage is the Popular Retinue, a great parade of dances, bestiary and spoken dances, and the human towers. They specially participate in Santa Tecla Festival. They are so popular in Tarragona and also in all Catalonia that they have got their own home. It is called "Casa de la Festa", Festivities House, where you can visit them all year.

A number of beaches, some awarded a Blue Flag designation, line the Mediterranean coast near the city.

Tarragona is located near the resort of Salou and the PortAventura World (PortAventura Park, the most visited theme park in Spain, Ferrari Land and also the PortAventura Caribe Aquatic Park).

The city is served by Camp de Tarragona railway station, and is located a few kilometres away from Reus Airport, which has many low-cost destinations and charter-flights (over a million passengers per year). The port is an export hub for the Spanish car industry.

Reus is the second city of the Tarragona area (101,767 inhabitants in 2006), known by its commercial activity and for being the place where the architect Antoni Gaudí was born.

The city hosted the 2018 Mediterranean Games, one year later than planned, because of political and economical instability.

Tourism 
Tarragona is one of the World Heritage Journeys in the European Union. Tourism is focused on the key sites of Mercat Central de Tarragona (Central Market of Tarragona), La Rambla Nova (the main shopping street), El Serrallo fishing village, the surrounding beaches of the golden coast, the key plazas (Plaça de la Font, Plaça del Fòrum, Plaça del Rei), Balcó del Mediterrani, Praetorium and Roman Circus, Roman Amphitheatre, Model of Roman Tarraco, and the cathedral.

The GR 92 long distance footpath, which roughly follows the length of the Mediterranean coast of Spain, has a staging point at Tarragona.

Food and drink 
Tarragona contains a number of small bars, restaurants, and cafes serving tapas and sandwiches, and local seafood and Catalan dishes like "pa amb tomàquet" or "neules i torrons". Many such outlets are found in the historic centre, including those at the Plaça de la Font, Plaça del Rei and Plaça del Fòrum. The neighbourhood of El Serrallo, at the harbour, specialises in seafood cuisine.

Chartreuse is the local drink of Tarragona. Originally created in 1605, it was considered by monks to be an “elixir for long life”. It is produced in yellow, with an alcohol content of 40º, as well as green, with a content of 55º. Between 1903 and 1989, the French liqueur made by the Carthusian Monks, Chartreuse, was distilled in Tarragona, following the monks' expulsion from France. Chartreuse is now a key part of the Feast of Santa Tecla. This Traditional Festival of national interest celebrates the patroness saint of the city 

Tarragona is home to two Michelin Guide recommended restaurants: El Terrat and Barquet. In addition, El Terrat and AQ were awarded one "Sol" each in the 2022 Guía Repsol.

Climate
The climate of Tarragona can be described as a humid subtropical climate (Köppen Cfa). Winters are mildly cool and summers are hot and sultry, while the rainiest seasons are autumn and spring.

Events

The Carnival
Tarragona International Dixieland Festival. Houses 25 bands and 100 concerts and activities the week before Holy Week.
Tarraco Viva. An international cultural festival dedicated to the history of the Roman period, with musical concerts, exhibitions, workshops and conferences.
Tarragona International Fireworks Displays Competition. The competition selects six international pyrotechnic companies every year. Official website1
Sant Magí Festival, held between 15 and 19 August.
Santa Tecla Festival, held between 15 and 24 September. It has been celebrated since 1321 and it is considered of national touristic interest by the state.
Tarragona 2018 XVIII Mediterranean Games, an international multi-sport event held from 22 June to 1 July 2018.
Tarragona was also a candidate to be the Spanish representative as European Capital of Culture in 2016.

Politics
The local Mayor is elected by the members of the plenary among its members the day the new municipal corporation is formed after the local election. The officeholder has a mandate for the 4-year duration of the elected body. If the Mayor leaves office ahead of time a new voting may take place among the plenary members in order to invest a new mayor (meanwhile, another local councillor, conventionally the first deputy mayor, may act as acting Mayor). Since 15 June 2019 the Mayor is Pau Ricomà. The opening session in which the Mayor is invested is traditionally held at the Saló de Plens.

List of mayors
Since the first democratic election after the Francoist dictatorship, Tarragona has had 4 democratically elected mayors:
Josep Maria Recasens (PSC): 1979–1989
Joan Miquel Nadal (CiU): 1989–2007
Josep Fèlix Ballesteros (PSC): 2007–2019
Pau Ricomà (ERC): 2019–present

The local is the body formed by the elected councillors of the Ajuntament. The plenary meetings (Ple) are held at the "Saló de Plens". It is formed by the municipal councillors, elected through closed party list proportional representation. 27 councillors are currently elected on the basis of the population of the municipality. Councillors are grouped in Municipal Groups on the basis of their political filiation. It has a Government Commission (Comissió de Govern; also Junta de Govern or Junta de Gobierno) is formed by the Mayor, the Deputy Mayors, and a number of appointed councillors.

International relations

Twin towns and sister cities

Tarragona is twinned with:

Tarragona had partnerships with:
 Voiron, France

Notable people
Domènec Batet (1872–1937), military general
Alejandro Cao de Benós (born 1974), political activist

See also
Archaeological Ensemble of Tarraco
Roman Catholic Archdiocese of Tarragona
Royal Tarragona Yacht Club

References
Notes

Sources
This article incorporates text from a publication now in the public domain: Smith, William, ed. (1854–1857). Dictionary of Greek and Roman Geography. London: John Murray.

External links

Official Website of Tarragona 
Government data pages 

 
Archaeological sites in Spain
Phoenician colonies in Spain
Mediterranean port cities and towns in Spain
Coloniae (Roman)
Roman sites in Spain
Tourism in Spain
Populated places in Tarragonès
Populated coastal places in Spain